Evzen Korec (born September 16, 1956) is a Czech scientist, businessman, the owner and CEO of the real estate development company EKOSPOL and Tabor Zoo. He is the co-author of 11 patents and more than 20 research articles published in international scientific journals. Korec has also written six books, one of which (Co je v domě, není pro mě!) became a bestseller shortly after publication.

Education and scientific career 
Korec graduated from the Faculty of Science, Charles University in 1981, in Molecular Biology and Genetics. His Master's thesis was titled "Analysis of Susceptibility and Resistance to Rous Sarcoma Virus in Inbred Line of Minor Poultry." Between 1983 and 1986, he worked as a researcher at the Institute of Molecular Genetics of the Czechoslovak Academy of Sciences, where he received a Ph.D. in Oncology with his doctoral thesis, "The Expression and Detection of Virus Proteins of Tumor Viruses."

After 1986, Korec completed long-term research fellowships at universities across Europe, including the University of Göttingen in Germany, and universities in London and Paris. He was the co-author of 11 patents in the field of Molecular Biology and Genetics, publishing more than 20 research articles in international scientific journals.

Business career
In 1992, he founded the real estate development company EKOSPOL, and has served as its CEO and chairman since then. EKOSPOL is one of the two largest residential developers in the Czech Republic by market share of apartment sales, and has also been listed among the 50 leading residential developers in Central and Eastern Europe by a trade magazine.

Korec lectures regularly at the University of Economics in Prague, and frequently comments on residential development, construction, housing market and the mortgage market in Czech media. Between 2010 and 2016 and in 2018, he was the most frequently quoted public figure in the Czech development industry, and EKOSPOL was the most frequently mentioned development company in the media.

In 2013, Korec received the Top Manager of the Sector of Real Estate Development and Construction Award in the Manager of the Year 2012 Awards.

Korec's rule 
As the CEO of EKOSPOL development company, Korec formulated Korec's rule, which says: "The final sales price of an apartment with the area of up to 50 m2 must correspond to a maximum of 20 times the annual rent in a given location. For larger apartments (large bedroom apartments, two bedroom apartments, etc.) the sales price should be on the level of a maximum of 25 to 30 times the annual rent."

Korec's rule helps a person interested in buying an apartment to relatively precisely determine the maximum sales price of an apartment in a given location. This rule applies generally, independent of the location. The rent price already reflects the attractiveness of the location, and the current rent price of a given location can be easily found on real estate websites.

Animal protection 
Korec is also active in the field of animal protection and preservation. In 2015, Korec rescued Tabor Zoo from liquidation, buying the zoo from an insolvency administrator. The zoo was re-opened to the public later that year, focused on the preservation of endangered species. Korec himself is a breeder of various animals, including koi carp and horses. He is the owner of Korec Corso kennel, home to the most successful bitch of the Cane Corso dog breed in the Czech Republic in 2015, Koleta Atison.

Through his company EKOSPOL, Korec supports the civic association Společnost pro zvířata ("Society for Animals") and charitable trust Česká Krajina, and also sponsors Tabor Zoo.

Korec also supports the animal rights campaign "Konec doby klecové" ("The End of the Cage Era") organized by Společnost pro zvířata (Society for Animals), with the goal of ending the cage farming of poultry and all other animal species in the Czech Republic, and Česká krajina's biodiversity protection projects focused on the reintroduction of native Czech animal species, such as wild horses, European bisons or aurochs.

Scientific research 
Korec leads a scientific group in Tabor Zoo focused on the genetics of two animal models – dogs and Bison sp. His group determined the average lifespan of Cane Corso dogs through a study of a statistically significant group in cooperation with 72 Cane Corso kennels from 25 countries. The research aims to extend the life of Cane Corso dogs. In this publication, the relationship between average lifespan and hair colour was described in mammals for the first time. The research results were published in the Open Veterinary Journal. Other articles are related to the inheritance of canine hip dysplasia and the inheritance of coat colour in the Cane Corso Italiano breed. The latter describes the segregation ratio of coat colour in the offspring in relation to the coat colour of the parents. The results suggest that at least one gene responsible for coat colouring is located on the sex chromosome. The findings are supposed to help breeders predict various traits of the litter.

Another project of Korec is focused on the longevity of European and American bison. The recent results determine the median longevity of Bison sp. and show that both Bison species show the biggest difference in longevity between sexes that has been described in mammals so far. This research aims to explain the genetic background of bison longevity, for use in European bison conservation and protection.

Korec is a member of the editorial board of the US veterinary journal Approaches in Poultry, Dairy & Veterinary Sciences.

Personal life
Korec is married to Jana, and they have one son.

Works 
 KOREC, E. & JANKOVSKÝ, M. Co je v domě, není pro mě!, aneb, Jak investovat do nemovitostí bez rizika a bez starostí. Praha: Ekospol, 2014. 169 s. .
KOREC, E. & KOVANDA, L. Koupě bytu pod lupou, aneb, Jak úspěšně vybrat, financovat a koupit byt. Praha: Ekospol, 2014. 99 s. .
 KOREC, E. Pozemky ukrývají poklady. Praha: Ekospol, 2015. 88 s. .
 KOREC, E. & SUŠANKA, F. Jak jsem zachránil ZOO v Táboře. Praha: Ekospol, 2016. 111 s. .
KOREC, E. Jak prodloužit život vašeho psa. Praha: Ekospol, 2019. .
 KOREC, E. & SUŠANKA, F. Noční život v ZOO Tábor aneb Jak surikata Máňa poznává své kamarády. Praha: Ekospol, 2019. .
KOREC, E. Chov psů – Příručka zodpovědného chovatele. Praha: Ekospol, 2020. 196 s. .
 KOREC, E. Dog breeding – A handbook for a responsible breeder. London: Europe Books, 2021. 132 s. .
 KOREC, E. Hundezucht und Welpenerziehung: Das große Handbuch für verantwortungsvolle Hundezüchter. 2021. 166 s. .
 KOREC, E. Cría del perro – Manual para un criador responsable. ACRIBIA, 2022. 150 s. .

Publications

KOREC, E., & HLOŽÁNEK, I. Susceptibility of the Minor line of inbred hens to the Rous sarcoma virus infection. Veterinarni Medicina UVTIZ. 1982.
KOREC, E., & HLOŽÁNEK, I. Analysis of the susceptibility of the Minor inbred chicken strain to Rous sarcoma virus infection. Veterinarni medicina, 27(3), 175–183. 1982.
KOREC, E., HLOŽÁNEK, I., & BENDA, V. A rapid detection of avian oncovirus group-specific antigens in feather pulp by the enzyme-linked immunosorbent assay. Folia biologica, 30(1), 15–23. 1984.
KOREC, E., HLOŽÁNEK, I., KORCOVÁ, H., & SIMU̇NEK, J. Amino acid sequence homology between protein products of oncogenes and hormones (v-myc—gastrin and oxytocin, v-sis—secretin). European Journal of Cancer and Clinical Oncology, 21(11), 1395. 1985.
MACH, O., GRÓFOVÁ, M., KOREC, E., KRCHŇÁK, V., BENDA, V., ČERNÁ, H., & BLAHOVÁ, Š. Antibodies against a synthetic decapeptide, precipitate protein kinase activity. European Journal of Cancer and Clinical Oncology, 21(11), 1399. 1985.
PLACHÝ, J., KOREC, E., HLOŽÁNEK, I., & ZDĔNKOVÁ, E. Genetic linkage of endogenous viral loci with the B (MHC) and C histocompatibility loci in chickens. Folia biologica, 31(5), 353–356. 1985.
PLACHÝ, J., KOREC, E., HLOŽÁNEK, I., & ZDĔNKOVÁ, E. Effect of the expression of an endogenous viral gene on the growth of tumours induced by Rous sarcoma virus in chickens. Folia biologica, 31(3), 235–240. 1985.
GUDKOV, A. V., KOREC, E., CHERNOV, M. V., TIKHONENKO, A. T., OBUKH, I. B., & HLOŽÁNEK, I. Genetic structure of the endogenous proviruses and expression of the gag gene in Brown Leghorn chickens. Folia biologica, 32(1), 65–72. 1986.
HLOŽÁNEK, I., DOSTÁLOVÁ, V., KOREC, E., ZELENÝ, V., KÖNIG, J., & NĔMECEK, V. Monoclonal antibodies to hepatitis B surface antigen: production and characterization. Folia biologica, 32(3), 167–177. 1986.
KOREC, E., HLOŽÁNEK, I., MACH, O., STARÁ, J., NĔMECEK, V., & KÖNIG, J. Detection of antibodies to hepatitis B surface antigen (HBsAg) using monoclonal antibody and the avidin-biotin system. Folia biologica, 32(6), 377–383. 1986.
KOREC, E., HLOŽÁNEK, I., STARÁ, J., & NĔMECEK, V. Anti-idiotype antibody as a prospective vaccine against hepatitis B. Folia biologica, 33(2), 98–103.1987.
HLOŽÁNEK, I., KOREC, E., DOSTÁLOVÁ, V., STARÁ, J., KÖNIG, J., BICHKO, V. SEICHERTOVÁ A. & GREN, E. J. Monoclonal antibodies against genetically manipulated hepatitis B core antigen. Folia biologica, 33(5), 295–300. 1987.
KOREC, E., & HLOŽÁNEK, I. Detection of avian leukosis virus group-specific antigens in feather pulp of chickens by Elisa. Folia Veterinaria (Czechoslovakia). 1987.
KOREC, E., HLOŽÁNEK, I., DOSTÁLOVÁ, V., STARÁ, J., ZELENÝ, V., & KÖNIG, J. Detection of hepatitis B surface antigens using monoclonal antibodies. Ceskoslovenska epidemiologie, mikrobiologie, imunologie, 37(1), 10. 1988.
KOREC, E., KORCOVÁ, J., KÖNIG, J., & HLOŽÁNEK, I. Detection of antibodies against hepatitis B core antigen using the avidin-biotin system. Journal of virological methods, 24(3), 321–325. 1989.
KOREC, E., KORCOVÁ, J., & HLOŽÁNEK, I. A suppressive mechanism counteracts the production of anti-idiotype antibody. Folia biologica, 35(5), 347–350. 1989.
KOREC, E., KORCOVÁ, J., PALKOVÁ, Z., VONDREJS, V., KORINEK, V., REINIŠ, M., BICHKO V.V. & HLOŽÁNEK, I. Expression of hepatitis B virus large envelope protein in Escherichia coli and Saccharomyces cerevisiae. Folia biologica, 35(5), 315–327. 1989.
KOREC, E., DOSTÁLOVÁ, V., KORCOVÁ, J., MANČAL, P., KÖNIG, J., BORISOVÁ, G. & HLOŽÁNEK, I. Monoclonal antibodies against hepatitis B e antigen: production, characterization, and use for diagnosis. Journal of virological methods, 28(2), 165–169. 1990.
KOREC, E., & GERLICH, W. H. Expression of large hepatitis B envelope protein mutants using a new expression vector. Archives of virology, 122(3-4), 367–371. 1992.
KOREC, E., & GERLICH, W. H. HBc and HBe specificity of monoclonal antibodies against complete and truncated HBc proteins from E. coli. In Chronically Evolving Viral Hepatitis (pp. 119–121). Springer, Vienna. 1992.
POSSEHL, C., REPP, R., HEERMANN, K. H., KOREC, E., UY, A., & GERLICH, W. H. Absence of free core antigen in anti-HBc negative viremic hepatitis B carriers. In Chronically Evolving Viral Hepatitis (pp. 39–41). Springer, Vienna. 1992.
REINIŠ, M., DAMKOVÁ, M., & KOREC, E. Receptor-mediated transport of oligodeoxynucleotides into hepatic cells. Journal of virological methods, 42(1), 99–105. 1993.
REINIŠ, M., REINIŠOVÁ, M., KOREC, E., & HLOŽÁNEK, I. Inhibition of hepatitis B virus surface gene expression by antisense oligodeoxynucleotides in a human hepatoma cell line. Folia biologica, 39(5), 262–269. 1993.
REINIŠ, M., DAMKOVÁ, M., & KOREC, E. Receptor-mediated transport of oligodeoxynucleotides into hepatic cells. Journal of virological methods, 42(1), 99–105. 1993.
KOREC, E., CHALUPA, O., HANČL, M., KORCOVÁ, J. BYDŽOVSKÁ, M. Longevity of Cane Corso Italiano dog breed and its relationship with hair colour. Open Veterinary Journal 7(2), 170–173, 2017.
KOREC, E. Longevity of Purebred Dog Breeds. Approaches in Poultry, Dairy & Veterinary Sciences, 1(2), 2017.
KOREC, E. The Lifespan of Humans and Animals Can Be Significantly Extended. Journal of Scientific and Technical Research. 1(5). 2017.
KOREC, E., CHALUPA, O., HANČL, M., KORCOVÁ, J. & BYDŽOVSKÁ, M. Segregation Analysis of Canine Hip Dysplasia in Cane Corso Italiano Dogs. Approaches in Poultry, Dairy & Veterinary Sciences 2(3), 2018.
KOREC, E., HANČL, M., KOTT, O., ŠKORPÍKOVÁ, L., SRBOVÁ, A., CHALUPA, O., GRIEBLOVÁ, A., ŠPLÍCHALOVÁ, P. & KORCOVÁ, J. Genus Bison Has the Biggest Sex-Related Difference in Longevity among Mammals. Approaches in Poultry, Dairy & Veterinary Sciences, 5(4), 2019.
KOREC, E., HANČL, M., BYDŽOVSKÁ, M., CHALUPA, O., & KORCOVÁ J. Inheritance of coat colour in the cane Corso Italiano dog. BMC genetics, 20(1), 24, 2019.
KOREC, E.; ELBLOVÁ, P.; KRÁLOVÁ J. The First Confirmed Case of Dental-Skeletal- Retinal-Anomaly (DSRA) in the Cane Corso Italiano Dog Breed in the Czech Republic. Approaches in Poultry, Dairy & Veterinary Sciences [online]. 2022, 8(5) [cit. 2023-02-17]. ISSN 25769162. Dostupné z: DOI: 10.31031/APDV.2022.08.000699
 KOREC, E.; UNGROVÁ, L.; HEJNAR, J.; GRIEBLOVÁ A. Four novel genes associated with longevity found in Cane corso purebred dogs. BMC Veterinary Research. 2022-05-19, roč. 18, čís. 1, s. 188. ISSN 1746-6148. DOI 10.1186/s12917-022-03290-9. PMID 35590325.
 KOREC, E.; UNGROVÁ, L.; HEJNAR, J.; GRIEBLOVÁ, A.; ZELENÁ, K. Three new genes associated with longevity in the European Bison. Veterinary and Animal Science. 2022-09, roč. 17, s. 100266. PMID: 35957660 PMCID: PMC9361326. Dostupné online [cit. 2022-10-03]. ISSN 2451-943X. DOI 10.1016/j.vas.2022.100266. PMID 35957660.

References

External links 
 Blog Evžena Korce, blog.iDNES.cz Evzen Korec's blog
 The Y generation will decide it all, says Evzen Korec, lidovky.cz, 18.5.2012

1956 births
Living people
Czech businesspeople
Charles University alumni